Doyle Justus is an American politician. He is the member-elect for the 41st district of the Missouri House of Representatives.

Life and career 
Justus is a former agriculture teacher.

In August 2022, Justus defeated Milton Schaper, Phil Newbold and Jeffrey Nowak in the Republican primary election for the 41st district of the Missouri House of Representatives. In November 2022, he defeated David Norman and Becky Martin in the general election, winning 72 percent of the votes.

References 

Living people
Year of birth missing (living people)
Place of birth missing (living people)
Republican Party members of the Missouri House of Representatives
21st-century American politicians